Origin Net is an ISP and telecommunications carrier operating across Europe and Oceania. Origin Net provides ADSL/NBN, Fibre Ethernet, Midband Ethernet, Fixed Wireless, EFM and IP transit connectivity solutions. Origin Net also provides hosting services, VoIP solutions, managed IT services and other internet services. Origin Net's headquarters are in Sydney CBD, with infrastructure operating out of multiple data centres across the world.

Origin Net owns and operates its own fixed wireless networks in Melbourne, Sydney, Brisbane, Greece, Monaco, Cairns, Townsville, Mount Isa, Toowoomba, Sunshine Coast, Forbes, Parkes and Orange.

References

External links 
 Telecommunications Industry Ombudsman Members Listing
 ACMA Annual Report 2011-2012
 ASN Listing AS133403

Internet service providers of Australia
Companies based in Sydney
Internet properties established in 2012
Telecommunications companies established in 2011
Privately held companies of Australia